Mariam Bolkvadze and Samantha Murray Sharan were the defending champions but chose not to participate.

Miriam Kolodziejová and Markéta Vondroušová won the title, defeating Jessika Ponchet and Renata Voráčová in the final, 6–4, 6–3.

Seeds

Draw

Draw

References

External Links
Main Draw

Internationaux Féminins de la Vienne - Doubles